Lambert Anthony Hoch (February 6, 1903 – June 27, 1990) was an American prelate of the Roman Catholic Church. He served as Bishop of Bismarck (1952–1956) and Bishop of Sioux Falls (1956–1978).

Biography

Early life 
Lambert Hoch was born on February 6, 1903, in Elkton, South Dakota, to George and Philomena (née Kniest) Hoch, the youngest of their nine children. After graduating from Elkton High School, he entered Creighton University at Omaha, Nebraska in 1920. He earned a Bachelor of Arts degree from Creighton in 1924, and then studied theology at St. Paul Seminary in St. Paul, Minnesota.

Priesthood 
Hoch was ordained to the priesthood for the Diocese of Sioux Falls by Bishop Bernard Mahoney on May 30, 1928.

Hoch then served as a professor of philosophy at Columbus College until 1929, when he became a curate at Immaculate Conception Parish in Watertown. In 1933 he was named chancellor of the diocese. In addition to his duties as chancellor, he served as chaplain of McKennan Hospital for eleven years. He was raised to the rank of domestic prelate in 1943.

Bishop of Bismarck 
On January 23, 1952, Hoch was appointed the third Bishop of Bismarck, North Dakota, by Pope Pius XII. He received his episcopal consecration on the following March 25 from Archbishop Amleto Cicognani, with Bishops William O. Brady and Francis Schenk serving as co-consecrators. He was the first native South Dakotan to become a Catholic bishop. Hoch was installed by Archbishop John Murray at the Cathedral of the Holy Spirit on April 2, 1952. During his four-year-long tenure, Hoch worked to promote vocations to the priesthood and religious life; between 1952 and 1960, 29 priests were ordained for the diocese and13 for Assumption Abbey in Richardton, North Dakota.

Bishop of Sioux Falls 
Hoch was named the fifth Bishop of Sioux Falls on November 27, 1956, by Pius XII. He was installed on December 5, 1956. He attended all four sessions of the Second Vatican Council in Rome between 1962 and 1965, and dedicated much of his administration to implementing the Council's reforms. Hoch fostered ecumenical relations with other faiths and helped establish the South Dakota Association of Christian Churches. In 1963, he baptized and confirmed the Fischer quintuplets, who were the first known surviving set of American quintuplets.

Retirement and legacy 
After reaching the mandatory retirement age of 75, Hoch resigned as bishop on June 13, 1978. Lambert Hoch died after a long illness at McKennan Hospital in Sioux Falls on June 27, 1990, at age 87.

In 2003, it was revealed that Hoch sent Bruce McArthur, a Diocese of Sioux Falls priest, to treatment twice after accusations of sexually molesting children in 1963 and 1965. Hoch did not report McArthur to police or to the parishioners.  In 1978, McArthur was sentenced to 23 months in Texas state prison for sexually assaulting a woman in a nursing home.

References

Episcopal succession

1903 births
1990 deaths
Creighton University alumni
University of St. Thomas (Minnesota) alumni
People from Brookings County, South Dakota
Participants in the Second Vatican Council
20th-century Roman Catholic bishops in the United States
Roman Catholic bishops of Sioux Falls
Roman Catholic bishops of Bismarck